The Natural Resources Defense Council (NRDC) is a United States-based 501(c)(3) non-profit international environmental advocacy group, with its headquarters in New York City and offices in Washington D.C., San Francisco, Los Angeles, Chicago, Bozeman, and Beijing. Founded in 1970, as of 2019, the NRDC had over three million members, with online activities nationwide, and a staff of about 700 lawyers, scientists and other policy experts.

History
The NRDC was founded in 1970. Its establishment was partially an outgrowth of the Scenic Hudson Preservation Conference v. Federal Power Commission, the Storm King case. The case centered on Con Ed's plan to build the world's largest hydroelectric facility at Storm King Mountain. The proposed facility would have pumped vast amounts of water from the Hudson River to a reservoir and released it through turbines to generate electricity at peak demand. A dozen concerned citizens organized the Scenic Hudson Preservation Conference in opposition to the project, citing its environmental impact, and the group, represented by Whitney North Seymour Jr., his law partner Stephen Duggan, and David Sive, sued the Federal Power Commission and successfully achieved a ruling that groups such as Scenic Hudson and other environmentalist groups had the standing to challenge the FPC's administrative rulings. Realizing that continued environmentalist litigation would require a nationally organized, professionalized group of lawyers and scientists, Duggan, Seymour, and Sive obtained funding from the Ford Foundation and joined forces with Gus Speth and three other recent Yale Law School graduates of the class of 1969: Richard Ayres, Edward Strohbehn Jr. and John Bryson. John H. Adams was the group's first staff member and Duggan its founding chairman; Seymour, Laurance Rockefeller, and others served as members of the board.

NRDC published onEarth, a quarterly magazine that dealt with environmental challenges, through 2016.  It was founded in 1979 as The Amicus Journal. As Amicus, it won the George Polk Award in 1983 for special interest reporting.

Programs 

The NRDC states the purpose of its work is "safeguard the earth—its people, its plants and animals, and the natural systems on which all life depends," and to "ensure the rights of all people to the air, the water and the wild, and to prevent special interests from undermining public interests." Their stated areas of work include: "climate change, communities, energy, food, health, oceans, water, the wild".

As a legal advocacy group, the NRDC works to accomplish environmental goals by operating within the legal system to reduce pollution and protect natural resources through litigation, and by working with professionals in science, law, and policy at the national and international level.

Staff 
The council's first president was John H. Adams, who served until 2006. He was replaced by Frances Beinecke, who served as president from 2006 to 2015. The third president was Rhea Suh, who served from 2015 to 2019.

In 2020, Gina McCarthy served as the CEO and president.  She previously served as the head of the Environmental Protection Agency in the Obama administration and became White House National Climate Advisor in the Biden administration in 2021. In 2021, NRDC selected Manish Bapna, formerly of the World Resources Institute, as their new president and CEO. At their web site NRDC state they have about 700 employees including scientists, lawyers, and policy advocates.

Legislation 
NRDC v. U.S. EPA (1973), with David Schoenbrod caused the United States Environmental Protection Agency to begin reducing tetraethyl lead in gasoline sooner than they were going to.

NRDC opposed the Water Rights Protection Act, a bill that would prevent federal agencies from requiring certain entities to relinquish their water rights to the United States in order to use public lands.

NRDC supported the EPS Service Parts Act of 2014 (H.R. 5057; 113th Congress), a bill that would exempt certain external power supplies from complying with standards set forth in a final rule published by the United States Department of Energy in February 2014.

Effect on administrative law 
The NRDC has been involved in the following Supreme Court cases interpreting United States administrative law.

 Vermont Yankee Nuclear Power Corp. v. Natural Resources Defense Council, Inc., which held that courts could not impose additional procedural requirements on administrative agencies beyond that required by the agency's organic statute or the Administrative Procedure Act.
 Chevron U.S.A., Inc. v. Natural Resources Defense Council, Inc., which gave administrative agencies broad discretion to interpret statute to make policy changes if Congressional intent was unclear. 
 Baltimore Gas & Elec. Co. v. Natural Resources Defense Council, Inc.,  is a United States Supreme Court decision which held to be valid a Nuclear Regulatory Commission (NRC) rule that the permanent storage of nuclear waste should be assumed to have no environmental impact during the licensing of nuclear power plants.

See also 

 Anti-nuclear movement
 Biodiversity
 Building Codes Assistance Project
 Environmental impact of mining
 Environmental movement
 Environmental Protection Agency
 Global warming
 Green building in the United States
 Green politics
 Opposition to Pebble Mine
 United States Green Building Council
 Winter v. Natural Resources Defense Council, concerning the balance of possible harm and government interest when issuing preliminary injunctions

References

Further reading
 John H. Adams & Patricia Adams, A Force for Nature: The Story of NRDC and Its Fight to Save Our Planet (Chronicle Books: 2010)

External links
 

 
1970 establishments in the United States
Environmental organizations based in New York City
Environmental organizations based in the United States
Environmental organizations established in 1970
Non-profit organizations based in New York City